KPN is a Dutch telecommunications company.

KPN may also refer to:

 KPN Travels, an Indian private travel company
 Kahn process networks, a model of computation for concurrent processes
 Korean People's Navy, the navy of North Korea
 Confederation of Independent Poland, a political party
 Kepkiriwát language, an extinct language of Brazil (by ISO 639 code)
 Kipnuk Airport, Alaska, United States (by IATA airport code)
 Kommando Peste Noire, an alternative name of Peste Noire, a French black metal band